Solanum dulcamara is a species of vine in the genus Solanum (which also includes the potato and the tomato) of the family Solanaceae. Common names include  bittersweet, bittersweet nightshade, bitter nightshade, blue bindweed, Amara Dulcis, climbing nightshade, felonwort, fellenwort, felonwood, poisonberry, poisonflower, scarlet berry, snakeberry, trailing bittersweet, trailing nightshade, violet bloom, and woody nightshade.

It is native to Europe and Asia, and widely naturalised elsewhere, including North America.

Overview
It occurs in a very wide range of habitats, from woodlands to scrubland, hedges and marshes.

Solanum dulcamara is a very woody herbaceous perennial vine, which scrambles over other plants, capable of reaching a height of 4 m where suitable support is available, but more often 1–2 m high. The leaves are 4–12 cm long, roughly arrowhead-shaped, and often lobed at the base. The flowers are in loose clusters of 3–20, 1–1.5 cm across, star-shaped, with five purple petals and yellow stamens and style pointing forward. The fruit is an ovoid red berry about 1 cm long, soft and juicy, with the aspect and odour of a tiny tomato, and edible for some birds, which disperse the seeds widely. However, the berry is poisonous to humans and livestock, and the berry's attractive and familiar look make it dangerous for children.

It is native to northern Africa, Europe, and Asia, but has spread throughout the world. The plant is relatively important in the diet of some species of birds such as European thrushes, which feed on its fruits, being immune to its poisons, and scatter the seeds abroad. It grows in all types of terrain with a preference for wetlands and the understory of riparian forests. Along with other climbers, it creates a dark and impenetrable shelter for varied animals. The plant grows well in dark areas in places where it can receive the light of morning or afternoon. An area receiving bright light for many hours reduces their development. It grows more easily in rich wet soils with plenty of nitrogen. When grown for medicinal purposes, it is best grown in a dry, exposed environment.

It is a nonnative species in the United States.

History

Solanum dulcamara has been valued by herbalists since ancient Greek times. In the Middle Ages the plant was thought to be effective against witchcraft, and was sometimes hung around the neck of cattle to protect them from the "evil eye".

John Gerard's Herball (1597) states that "the juice is good for those that have fallen from high places, and have been thereby bruised or beaten, for it is thought to dissolve blood congealed or cluttered anywhere in the intrals and to heale the hurt places."

Biological activity
This plant is one of the less poisonous members of the Solanaceae. Instances of poisoning in humans are very rare on account of the fruit's intensely bitter taste. Incidentally, the fruit has been reported to have a sweet aftertaste, hence the vernacular name bittersweet.

The poison in this species is believed to be solanine. The alkaloids, solanine (from unripe fruits), solasodine (from flowers) and beta-solamarine (from roots) have been found to inhibit the growth of E. coli and S. aureus.
Solanine and solasodine  extracted from Solanum dulcamara showed antidermatophytic activity against Chrysosporium indicum, Trichophyton mentagrophytes and T. simil, thus it may cure ringworm.

The stems are approved by the German Commission E for external use as supportive therapy in chronic eczema.

Medicinal use 
Solanum dulcamara has a variety of documented medicinal uses, all of which are advised to be approached with proper caution as the entirety of the plant is considered to be poisonous. Always seek advice from a professional before using a plant medicinally. There have only been records of medicinal use for adults (not children) and it is possible to be allergic to Solanum dulcamara; medicinal use is not advised in these cases.

Use of stem 
The stem of Solanum dulcamara is believed to be considerably less poisonous than the rest of the plant, and it has mostly been used in treatment for conditions of the skin. There are records of it being used to treat mild recurrent eczema, psoriasis, scabies, and dermatomycosis. Stems are harvested when they do not yet have leaves (or the leaves have already fallen) and are shredded into small pieces. They are mostly known to be applied in the form of liquid onto the skin, but infusing it into a drink is also possible, though not recommended. The stem has also been used in treatment for bronchitis, asthma, and pneumonia.

Use of leaves, fruit, and root 
The leaves of Solanum dulcamara have been known to treat warts and tumors, while the fruit can treat conditions of the respiratory tract and joints. It has been documented that Indigenous people of North America used the roots for relief of fever and nausea.

Symbolism 
Solanum dulcamara has been symbolized with fidelity. This is due to its distinct property of extreme bitterness to surprising sweetness, hence its common name "bittersweet." This symbolism is seen in Christian art from the Middle Ages as well as in bridal wreaths.

Bittersweet exists on a balance between sweet and bitter, medicine and poison, life and death; lending it to be a common metaphor. Shakespeare has been known to employ this metaphor in dramas such as Macbeth and The Winter's Tale. 

Perhaps this parallelism has been used more directly by Italian composer Gaetano Donizetti in his opera L'Elisir d'Amore (Love Elixir). Here, a Dr. Dulcamara sells the protagonist, Nemorino, a love elixir at the cost of his fortune. However, this "love elixir" is actually just cheap red wine. Under the illusion of a love elixir (and drunkenness), Nemorino, is confident to profess his love to an indifferent woman, Adina. Upon independently learning of Nemorino's fidelity by spending his fortune, Adina subsequently falls in love as well. Dr. Dulcamara has bitterly sold a fake elixir that had turned out to have sweet consequences anyway. This happy unexpectedness is at the heart of Solanum dulcamara.

Gallery

References

dulcamara
Plants described in 1753
Taxa named by Carl Linnaeus
Flora of Europe
Flora of Asia
Garden plants of Europe
Poisonous plants